Cookeen is a British brand of block vegetable fat, marketed for use in making pastry, and other baked goods.  It is claimed to be usable straight from the refrigerator.

It is sold by Princes Limited, a British food producer owned by Mitsubishi. The brand is owned by Edible Oils Limited, a joint venture between Archer Daniels Midland (ADM), an American food processing corporation, and Princes.  The product is produced at a factory in Erith, England.

In October 2006, Cookeen and the other hard vegetable fats manufactured by Edible Oils Limited were reformulated to remove hydrogenated vegetable oils, which contain trans fat, due to health concerns.

Popular culture

The advertising slogan "Give 'em a lift with Cookeen" was later used by Matt Lucas in a parody song for his character George Dawes on the British comedy panel show Shooting Stars.

References

External links
Princes Limited 
Cookeen website

Cooking fats
Joint ventures
Archer Daniels Midland